The mushroom species of Hawaii inhabit the Hawaiian archipelago in the central North Pacific Ocean, southwest of the continental United States, southeast of Japan, and northeast of Australia. The islands are part of the State of Hawaii, United States.

At the southeastern end of the archipelago, the eight "main islands" are (from the northwest to southeast) Niihau, Kauai, Oahu, Molokai, Lānai, Kahoolawe, Maui, and Hawaii. The Northwestern Hawaiian Islands include many atolls, and reefs. Due to Hawaii's isolation many mushroom species are endemic (unique to the island chain).

This archipelago and its oceans are physiographically and ethnologically part of the Polynesian subregion of Oceania.

The climate of Hawaii is typical for a tropical area, although temperatures and humidity tend to be a bit less extreme than other tropical locales due to the frequent trade winds blowing from the east.

Species of fish

Images

References

External links 

Fungi of Hawaii
Fungi by location